Antonya Nelson (born January 6, 1961) is an American author and teacher of creative writing who writes primarily short stories.

Life and education
Antonya Nelson was born January 6, 1961, in Wichita, Kansas.
She received a BA degree from the University of Kansas in 1983 and an MFA degree from the University of Arizona in 1986.  She lives in Telluride, Colorado; Las Cruces, New Mexico; and Houston, Texas.

Career
Nelson's short stories have appeared in Esquire, The New Yorker, Quarterly West, Redbook, Ploughshares, Harper's, and other magazines. They have been anthologized in Prize Stories: The O. Henry Awards and Best American Short Stories.

Several of her books have been New York Times Book Review Notable Books: In the Land of Men (1992), Talking in Bed (1996), Nobody's Girl: A Novel (1998), Living to Tell: A Novel (2000), and Female Trouble (2002).

For a 1999 issue on The Future of American Fiction, The New Yorker magazine selected Nelson as one of "the twenty best young fiction writers in America today".

Nelson teaches in the Warren Wilson College MFA Program for Writers, as well as in the University of Houston's Creative Writing Program.

Selected awards
 National Endowment for the Arts Literary Fellowship, 1989
 Guggenheim Fellowship, 2000
 Rea Award for the Short Story, 2003
United States Artists Fellow, 2009.

Selected works

Novels

Short fiction 

Collections
 
 
 
 
 
 
 

Stories

Notes

References

Further reading

 
 
 Short Story: "One-Way Ticket" on Fictionaut

1961 births
Living people
20th-century American novelists
21st-century American novelists
American women novelists
American women short story writers
Writers from Wichita, Kansas
University of Houston faculty
New Mexico State University faculty
University of Kansas alumni
University of Arizona alumni
The New Yorker people
20th-century American women writers
21st-century American women writers
20th-century American short story writers
21st-century American short story writers
Novelists from Texas
American women academics